Pachygnatha tristriata is a species of long-jawed orb weaver in the family of spiders known as Tetragnathidae. It is found in the United States and Canada.

References

Tetragnathidae
Articles created by Qbugbot
Spiders described in 1845